The Hartford Gaelic Athletic Association or Hartford GAA, is a Gaelic games club based in Connecticut. Founded in 1914, the club competes in Gaelic games competitions as part of the Northeast Division GAA Board.

History
There are numerous references to hurling and football games in the archives of local Hartford newspapers stretching back to early in the twentieth century.  The Hartford Gaelic team defeated Waterbury in 1914 to become State Champions and that the Kevin Barry Hurling Club was active in Hartford starting in the 1920s. Hartford has won a National Championship and many State Championships through the 1970s and 80s.

Honours
2021 Northeast Junior C Football Champions

References

External links
 Hartford GAA website

Gaelic games clubs in the United States
Irish-American culture in Connecticut
North American GAA
Sports in Hartford, Connecticut